Marcela Gándara (born 24 August 1983) is a Mexican singer-songwriter of Christian music. To date she has produced 6 Christian albums in Spanish.

She began singing at an early age as it was one of her passions. At 18, she had the opportunity to enter an intensive biblical seminar, and there was where she decided to devote herself to Christian music. She was part of the worship team in her local church and then joined the choir.

Fellow Mexican singer Jesús Adrián Romero attended her congregation for a time and it was where they met. Marcela began in the music world by singing background vocals on various projects of Stem Productions, the label with which they would later work.

Discography
 Más Que Un Anhelo (2006)
 El Mismo Cielo (2009)
 Live (2012)
 Cerca Estás (2017)

Awards and nominations

References

External links
 

1983 births
Living people
Mexican Christians
Mexican performers of Christian music
Singers from Chihuahua (state)
21st-century Mexican singers
Women in Latin music